Philipp Huber (born 18 February 1974) is a Swiss decathlete. His personal best result was 8153 points, achieved in June 2000 in Götzis.

Achievements

External links

1974 births
Living people
Swiss decathletes
Athletes (track and field) at the 1996 Summer Olympics
Athletes (track and field) at the 2000 Summer Olympics
Olympic athletes of Switzerland